Dr. Richárd Hörcsik (born December 23, 1955) is a Hungarian politician, member of the National Assembly (MP) for Sátoraljaújhely (Borsod-Abaúj-Zemplén County Constituency X then V) since 1998. He was also a Member of Parliament from the MDF Borsod-Abaúj-Zemplén County Regional List between 1990 and 1994. He served as Mayor of Sárospatak from 2006 to 2010.

Political career
In 1990 he secured a seat from the Borsod-Abaúj-Zemplén County Regional List of the Hungarian Democratic Forum (MDF). During the same term he was a member of the Delegation to the Council of Europe. In 1994 he unsuccessfully ran to secure a seat in the parliament.

In 1998 and 2002 he managed to secure a seat again as an individual representative for Constituency X, Borsod-Abaúj-Zemplén County. Since 2000 he served as a vice chairman of the Committee on European Integration. At the October 2002 municipal elections he became a member of the Borsod-Abaúj-Zemplén County Assembly. In the course of the development of the organisational structure of Fidesz-Hungarian Civic Union in 2003, he was charged with heading the Debrecen constituency. Upon the invitation of parliamentary faction leader János Áder, at the beginning of September 2004 he took over the chair of the integration cabinet from József Szájer, who had been elected member of the European Parliament. He was elected MP for Sátoraljaújhely in the 2006, 2010 and 2014 elections. He is the current Chairman of the Committee on European Affairs since May 14, 2010.

References

1955 births
Living people
Hungarian Democratic Forum politicians
Fidesz politicians
Members of the National Assembly of Hungary (1990–1994)
Members of the National Assembly of Hungary (1998–2002)
Members of the National Assembly of Hungary (2002–2006)
Members of the National Assembly of Hungary (2006–2010)
Members of the National Assembly of Hungary (2010–2014)
Members of the National Assembly of Hungary (2014–2018)
Members of the National Assembly of Hungary (2018–2022)
Members of the National Assembly of Hungary (2022–2026)
Mayors of places in Hungary
People from Sátoraljaújhely